Ama Agbeze  (born 12 November 1982) is an England netball international. She was captain when England won the gold medal at the 2018 Commonwealth Games. She was also a member of the England team that won the bronze medal at the 2006 Commonwealth Games. As of 2020, Agbeze has played for at least sixteen different club teams in England, Australia and New Zealand.

Early life, family and education
Agbeze is originally from Nigeria, she was born by Nigerian parents in Birmingham. She has two older sisters and a younger brother. She was educated at Kings Norton Girls' School and Monkton Combe School. Between 2004 and 2007 she attended Loughborough University where she gained an MSc in Finance and Management. She also studied Law and Criminal Justice at the University of Leicester and is a qualified lawyer. In 2016 she married Fred Donovan, a New Zealander, in Auckland.

Playing career

Super Cup
During the Super Cup era, between 2001 and 2005, Agbeze played for Team Bath, Birmingham Blaze, Northumbria Flames and London Hurricanes.

Netball Superleague
Between 2005 and 2007, while attending Loughborough University, Agbeze played for Loughborough Lightning in the Netball Superleague. She would return to Lightning for a second spell in 2016. She also played for Leeds Carnegie during the 2008–09 season.

Agbeze spent the 2019 Netball Superleague season at London Pulse, then joined up with Saracens Mavericks for the 2019 British Fast5 Netball All-Stars Championship before joining Severn Stars for the 2020 season.

Australia and New Zealand
Agbeze played for three franchises in the ANZ Championship. In 2008 she was one of several England internationals to join the new league. Together with Karen Atkinson, she signed for West Coast Fever. She subsequently moved to the Melbourne Vixens for the 2009 season and then to Central Pulse for the 2010 season. In 2011 she returned to West Coast Fever. During 2012 Agbeze served as a player-coach for West Coast Falcons, helping them win the West Australian Netball League. She was also awarded the Jill McIntosh Medal. In 2013 she played for Territory Storm in the Australian Netball League, then rejoined Central Pulse for the 2014 and 2015 ANZ Championship seasons. She subsequently played for Adelaide Thunderbirds during the 2017 Suncorp Super Netball season and for Northern Stars during the 2018 ANZ Premiership season. She played for Northern Mystics during the 2021 ANZ Premiership season.

England
Agbeze made her senior debut for England in 2001. She was a member of the England team that won the bronze medal at the 2006 Commonwealth Games. In 2016 she was appointed England captain She subsequently captained England as they won the 2016 European Netball Championship, the 2017 Fast5 Netball World Series and the gold medal at the 2018 Commonwealth Games. In October 2018, Agbeze made 100th senior appearance for England during a series against Jamaica.

Honours
England
Commonwealth Games
Winners: 2018: 1
Fast5 Netball World Series
Winners: 2017: 1
European Netball Championship
Winners: 2016: 1
Netball Quad Series
Runners up : 2018 (Jan), 2018 (Sep): 2
Melbourne Vixens 
ANZ Championship
Winners: 2009
Northern Mystics
ANZ Premiership
Winners: 2021

References

1982 births
Living people
English netball players
English netball coaches
Commonwealth Games gold medallists for England
Commonwealth Games bronze medallists for England
Netball players at the 2006 Commonwealth Games
Netball players at the 2018 Commonwealth Games
Commonwealth Games medallists in netball
AENA Super Cup players
Netball Superleague players
ANZ Championship players
ANZ Premiership players
Suncorp Super Netball players
Australian Netball League players
West Australian Netball League players
New South Wales state netball league players
Territory Storm players
Surrey Storm players
Yorkshire Jets players
Loughborough Lightning netball players
London Pulse players
Mavericks netball players
Team Northumbria netball players
Team Bath netball players
Severn Stars players
Adelaide Thunderbirds players
Central Pulse players
Melbourne Vixens players
Northern Stars players
West Coast Fever players
Northern Mystics players
Sportspeople from Birmingham, West Midlands
English expatriate netball people in Australia
English expatriate netball people in New Zealand
Black British sportswomen
English people of Ghanaian descent
People educated at Monkton Combe School
Alumni of Loughborough University
Alumni of the University of Leicester
Members of the Order of the British Empire
21st-century English lawyers
English women lawyers
21st-century women lawyers
21st-century English women
Medallists at the 2006 Commonwealth Games
Medallists at the 2018 Commonwealth Games